Now Please Don't You Cry, Beautiful Edith is an album by the jazz multi-instrumentalist Roland Kirk, released on the Verve label in 1967. It contains performances by Kirk with Lonnie Liston Smith, Ronnie Boykins and Grady Tate.

Reception
The AllMusic review by Thom Jurek states: "Now Please Don't You Cry, Beautiful Edith (about Kirk's wife) was the first of his all groove sides.... This was the beginning of the exploration that led listeners to Blacknuss and Boogie-Woogie String Along for Real, and it is worth every bit as those two recordings". Richard Cook and Brian Morton rated the CD reissue of the album, combined with the album  Rip, Rig and Panic, with the second-highest grade in their Penguin Guide to Jazz, and named the reissue as part of their suggested “core collection” of essential recordings.

Track listing 
All compositions by Roland Kirk except as noted
 "Blue Rol" - 6:09
 "Alfie" (Burt Bacharach, Hal David) - 2:52
 "Why Don't They Know" - 2:54
 "Silverlization" - 4:57
 "Fall Out" - 3:01
 "Now Please Don't You Cry, Beautiful Edith" - 4:23
 "Stompin' Grounds" - 4:46
 "It's a Grand Night for Swinging" (Billy Taylor) - 3:10

Personnel 
 Roland Kirk: tenor saxophone, manzello, stritch, flute
 Lonnie Liston Smith: piano
 Ronnie Boykins: bass
 Grady Tate: drums

References 

1967 albums
Verve Records albums
Rahsaan Roland Kirk albums
Albums produced by Creed Taylor
Albums recorded at Van Gelder Studio